Vickie Otis (born May 5, 1962) is an American retired professional wrestler, better known by her ring name, Princess Victoria.

Professional wrestling career 
Otis was trained in Portland, Oregon by Sandy Barr. She feuded with another of Barr's trainees, Velvet McIntyre. The two women competed against each other in singles and tag team matches in Vancouver All Star Wrestling.

National Wrestling Alliance (1980–1983) 
Both women continued their feud while working for NWA Pacific Northwest under promoter Don Owen. They eventually ended their feud and formed a tag team. The duo won the WWF Women's Tag Team Championship on May 13, 1984 in Calgary, Alberta.

World Wrestling Federation (1983–1984) 
In 1983, the World Wrestling Federation withdrew from the National Wrestling Alliance, and when McIntyre and Victoria rejoined the promotion in 1984, they were immediately recognized as holding the WWF Women's Tag Team Championship. The duo defended the championship against the team of Wendi Richter and Peggy Lee multiple times, including a match on April 23, 1984 in Madison Square Garden. On September 1, 1984, Otis suffered a career-ending neck injury defending the tag team titles in Philadelphia. The title she held was retired shortly thereafter. Desiree Petersen later replaced Victoria when she was let go from the WWF in 1984.

While in the WWF, she also wrestled in singles matches as a challenger against WWF Women's Champion The Fabulous Moolah who was also responsible for training her, & booking her, which she discussed in detail while appearing on The Fabulous Moolah episode of Dark Side of the Ring.

Retirement 
In 2012, Desiree Peterson and Princess Victoria managed pro-wrestler Rescue 911 (Christopher Annino) and Lady Liberty (Nikki Moccia) at a Showcase Pro Wrestling event in Clinton, Connecticut for Cystic Fibrosis awareness. Prior to her move to Washington Victoria lived in Virginia and volunteered her time at South Hampton County Animal Shelter. Otis is retired from professional wrestling and now resides in Washington.

In July 2016, Otis was named part of a class action lawsuit filed against WWE which alleged that wrestlers incurred traumatic brain injuries during their tenure and that the company concealed the risks of injury.  The suit was litigated by attorney Konstantine Kyros, who has been involved in a number of other lawsuits against WWE. According to her, due to WWE’s lack of medical attention, she is fully disabled and sometimes has to use a wheelchair. In September 2018, the lawsuit was dismissed by US District Judge Vanessa Lynne Bryant.

She appeared an episode of the Vice Media production Tales From The Territories.

Championships and accomplishments 
 Cauliflower Alley Club
 Women's Wrestling Award (2018)
 National Wrestling Alliance
 NWA United States Women's Championship (1 time)
 NWA World Women's Tag Team Championship (1 time) - with Sabrina
 World Wrestling Federation
 WWF Women's Tag Team Championship (1 time) - with Velvet McIntyre

References

External links 
 
 Princess Victoria profile

1962 births
20th-century professional wrestlers
21st-century American women
American female professional wrestlers
Living people
Native American professional wrestlers
Professional wrestlers from Oregon